St Kilda is an inner seaside suburb in Melbourne, Victoria, Australia, 6 km (4 miles) south-east of the Melbourne central business district, located within the City of Port Phillip local government area. St Kilda recorded a population of 19,490 at the 2021 census.

The traditional owners of St Kilda are the Yaluk-ut Weelam clan of the Boon Wurrung people of the Kulin Nation.

St Kilda was named by Charles La Trobe, then superintendent of the Port Phillip District, after a schooner, Lady of St Kilda, which moored at the main beach in early 1842. Later in the Victorian era, St Kilda became a favoured suburb of Melbourne's elite, and many palatial mansions and grand terraces were constructed along its hills and waterfront. After the turn of the century, the St Kilda foreshore became Melbourne's favoured playground, with electric tram lines linking the suburbs to the seaside amusement rides, ballrooms, cinemas and cafes, and crowds flocked to St Kilda Beach. Many of the mansions and grand terraces became guest houses, and gardens were filled in with apartment buildings, making St Kilda the most densely populated suburb in Melbourne.

After World War II, St Kilda became Melbourne's red-light district, and the guest houses became low-cost rooming houses. By the late 1960s, St Kilda had developed a culture of bohemianism, attracting prominent artists and musicians, including those in the punk and LGBT subcultures. While some of these groups still maintain a presence in St Kilda, since the 2000s the district has experienced rapid gentrification, pushing many lower socio-economic groups out to other areas, with the suburb again being sought after by the wealthy. Since at least the 1950s, the suburb has been the axis of Melbourne's Jewish community.

St Kilda is home to many of Melbourne's visitor attractions including Luna Park, St Kilda Pier, the Palais Theatre and the Esplanade Hotel. It hosts many of Melbourne's big events and festivals.

Name

Before being officially named St Kilda in 1842 by Charles La Trobe, who was superintendent of the Port Phillip District of New South Wales, the area was known by several names, including 'Green Knoll', 'Punk Town' and 'The Village of Fareham'. It was eventually named after the schooner Lady of St Kilda, which was owned between 1834 and 1840 by Sir Thomas Acland. Acland sold the vessel in 1840 to Jonathan Cundy Pope of Plymouth. The vessel sailed for Port Phillip in February 1841. The ship was used in Port Phillip as a cargo vessel; in January 1842 it was docked in Hobson Bay and listed for sale by exchange of sheep. The vessel was moored at the main beach for the early part of 1842, which was soon known as "the St Kilda foreshore".

The schooner Lady of St Kilda was named in honour of Lady Grange, who was imprisoned by her husband between 1734 and 1740 on the island of Hirta, the largest island in the St Kilda archipelago, on the western edge of Scotland.

History

The Euroe Yroke area (now known as St Kilda) was inhabited an estimated 31,000 to 40,000 years ago. Evidence has been found of shellfish middens and huts along Albert Park and Lake and axes which were most likely sharpened on the sandstone cliffs behind the main beach. Corroborees were held at the historic tree which still stands at St Kilda Junction, at the corner of Fitzroy Street and Queens Road. Much of the area north of present-day Fitzroy Street was swampland, part of the Yarra River delta, which comprised vast areas of wetlands and sparse vegetation.

The first European settler in St Kilda was Benjamin Baxter in around 1839. He was a settler from Melbourne on a grazing lease. In 1840, St Kilda was the home to Melbourne's first quarantine station for Scottish immigrants.

The area was officially named St Kilda in 1842. The first sale of Crown lands for the village of St Kilda took place on 7 December 1842. The first block was bought by James Ross Lawrence, who had been master of the Lady of St Kilda until 1842. Lawrence had now settled in Melbourne. His block was bounded by three unmade roads. One of these roads he named Acland Street, after Thomas Acland, who had been his employer until 1840 but who had never been to Port Phillip District. The remaining two became Fitzroy Street and The Esplanade. (A plaque at the junction of Acland and Fitzroy Streets marks the site of the block.) By 1845, Lawrence had subdivided and sold the land on which he had built a cottage. The land on the sea side of The Esplanade has continued to be Crown land.

Within a few years St Kilda became a fashionable area for the wealthy, and the indigenous peoples were driven out to surrounding areas. The high ground above the beach offered a cool fresh breeze during Melbourne's hot summer months.

St Kilda became a separate municipality on 24 April 1857, and in the same year, the railway line connected St Kilda to Melbourne city, and a loop line to Windsor. These railway lines made the area even more attractive as a place to settle, and attracted visitors to St Kilda Beach, the St Kilda Pier, the privately run sea baths, and events like the St Kilda Cup. Cricket and bowling clubs were formed in 1855 and 1865 respectively. By the mid-1860s St Kilda had about fifteen hotels, including the George (which began as the Terminus in 1857).

Land boom

St Kilda's population more than doubled between 1870 and 1890, to about 19,000 persons. By the time of the Land Boom of the 1880s St Kilda had become a district of great mansions, large villas in extensive gardens, grand terraces, and palatial hotels, particularly along the main streets such as Fitzroy Street, Grey Street and Acland Street, while the other streets were lined with villas and terraces of more modest dimensions. The area known as St Kilda Hill, on the other side of High Street (now known as the St Kilda part of St Kilda Road and originally lined with shops), between Wellington Street, Alma Road, and Chapel Street was also developed with mansions and large houses, as well as St Kilda's Synagogue. The Esplanade Hotel was built in 1878 overlooking St Kilda Beach, and the George Hotel opposite the station was greatly expanded in 1889. The smaller streets with smaller blocks between the big estates were developed with modest cottages and terraces, housing the working class population of the area.

The flatter inland areas of St Kilda East was also dominated by mansions and large villas in extensive grounds, but also smaller more typical Victorian houses.  Much of the area which is now St Kilda West was swampland, but was reclaimed and subdivided in the 1870s, with more large houses and terraces, mostly in the area close to Fitzroy Street.

Cable tram lines across Melbourne were built in the late 1880s, with a line from Swanston Street in central Melbourne along St Kilda Road to St Kilda Junction completed in 1888, and a line from Windsor station at Chapel Street along Wellington Street and Fitzroy Streets, then around the Esplanade opening in 1891, making the suburb and the beachfront easily accessible.

Seaside playground

The boom of the 1880s ended with the bank crashes of the early 1890s and subsequent depression, affecting all levels of society, but ruining many of the newly wealthy. Many of St Kilda's mansions and spacious terrace houses became guest houses, and the wealthy elite retreated to other exclusive suburbs such as Brighton and Toorak.

From 1906, the Victorian Railways operated a tram line, described as an 'Electric Street Railway', from St Kilda Station to Brighton, via Grey Street, Barkly Street and Mitford Street in Elwood. The developing electric tram lines in the east and southeastern suburbs soon arrived as well, with two lines terminating in front of Luna Park by 1913, joined by the electric line that replaced the cable car in 1925, bringing cords of day-trippers to the beach front.

Carlo Catani, a native of Italy, a local resident, and Chief Engineer of the Public Works Department, was a founding member of the St Kilda Foreshore Committee established in 1906, tasked with the beautification of the St Kilda foreshore, for which he did the design. His plan saw the creation of park and lawn areas, paths and promenades, rockeries and gardens and avenues of trees and palms right along the foreshore. The committee also oversaw the leases for the various amusement operators wishing to cater to the growing visitation to the area, which included the Dreamland amusement park (1906 - 1909), a new St Kilda Sea Baths (1910), which replaced the 1862 "Gymnasium Baths", Luna Park (1912), the Palais de Danse (1919 and 1926), the Palais Theatre (1927), and many others. Catani died in 1918 before he could see the full vision realised, and several landmarks along the foreshore have been named after him, including a memorial clock tower, gardens and an arch. Other amusements developed in the area, such as the Wattle Path Palais dance hall (later the St Moritz Ice Rink) on the Upper Esplanade, and the Venue next door, and the Victory Cinema in 1928 on the corner of Barkly and Carlisle (later the National Theatre). St Kilda served a similar function for Melburnians as did Coney Island to the residents of New York City. with Acland Street and Fitzroy Street became lined with shops, often built in the front gardens of the earlier houses, which housed numerous restaurants and cafes. Apartment development also concentrated in the area, some in the gardens of the mansions, some replacing them, or transforming them, with the result that St Kilda became the most densely populated suburb in Melbourne, often single people who moved away from family life, which combined with the numerous sometimes late night amusements, gave the suburb a racy reputation. This reputation was exacerbated by the Great Depression, and it became the growing focus of many of Melbourne's social issues including crime, prostitution and drug abuse.

St Kilda had become a favoured location for Melbourne's wealthier Jewish community in the 19th century, which continued through the interwar years. The community grew markedly just before and after World War II, with refugees from war-torn European, and developed an Orthodox community along with the existing Reformed one, opening new synagogues and schools. They settled in apartments in St Kilda, East St Kilda and Elwood, and Acland Street. Cafe Scheherazade on Acland Street was established in the 1950s, and served up borscht and latkes for decades, becoming an icon for this community. By the 1980s, the Jewish centre of Melbourne had moved eastward to more affluent Caulfield. Scheherazade moved to Caulfield in 2008.

Decline

World War II saw servicemen flock to the beach amusements, where they also met members of the opposite sex, increasing St Kilda's reputation for loose morals. Leo's Spaghetti bar and gelateria was opened for the Olympics in 1956 by an Italian migrant as one of Melbourne's first Italian restaurants and quickly became a Melbourne establishment.

With numerous small apartments, and plenty of meeting places, St Kilda became one of the city's main areas of bohemianism, as well as attracting a gay and lesbian population. From 1965, Mirka Mora's Tolarno Hotel became the focus of many of the local artists. By the mid 1960s the Fitzroy Street area had become known for prostitution, with a number of strip-tease cabarets, notably at the once high-class George Hotel.

In the early 1960s works to the Lower Esplanade turned it into a fast moving connection between Marine Parade and Beaconsfield Parade, creating a barrier to the beach, except for a pedestrian crossover and several traffic lights. In 1968, the Palais de Danse, adjacent to the Palais was gutted by fire. The Palace nightclub was built in its place in 1971 (in 2007 this building was closed, gutted by fire, and demolished).

In the late 1960s St Kilda Junction was rebuilt to create a Queens Way underpass connection to Dandenong Road, and in the early 1970s St Kilda Road (formerly High Street) from the junction to Carlisle Street was widened by demolishing all the properties on the west side. The landmark Junction Hotel was lost, and High Street, once St Kilda's shopping centre, ceased to function as such. The widening also had the effect of creating a physical barrier between St Kilda's foreshore, civic area and eastern residential streets.

The St Moritz ice rink was closed in 1981; around 1982, it was destroyed by a fire.

Gentrification
In 1987, the St Kilda railway line was closed, rationalised and re-opened to become part of route 96, one of the first light rail lines in Melbourne, terminating at Acland Street.

St Kilda also experienced increased gentrification during the 1990s, particularly popular with yuppies due to its proximity to the CBD. The increased cost of rentals led many long-term residents to leave and removed much of the bohemian and artistic character of the area.

In 1991, the site formerly occupied by the St Moritz ice rink was reopened as the St Moritz hotel, which became the Novotel Bayside in 1993, then Novotel St Kilda in 1999.

In mid-1998, Becton, new owners of the Esplanade Hotel announced its plan to build a 125-metre, 38-storey tower behind the historic hotel. The plans were later scaled down due to resident concerns.

On 11 September 2003, the St Kilda icon, the 99-year-old pier kiosk burned down in an arson attack. In a swift and overwhelming response to the loss, the government committed to its original plans using what remained of the original materials.

In 2004, Baymour Court, significant 1920s Spanish Mission flats and hotel stables were demolished despite the campaigning of the National Trust of Victoria and The Esplanade Alliance as part of the commencement of hi-rise Esplanade apartment building.

For the 2006 Commonwealth Games, St Kilda hosted an interpretive public artwork called the Lady of St Kilda, a mock timber sculpture of the shipwreck. The installation was visited by locals and tourists and it was left erected for many months afterward. However, the sculpture was subject to vandals disassembling parts of it as well as concern for children's safety on the high unprotected bow of the "ship" so the local council removed it in November 2006.

The area adjacent to the Palais Theatre known as the Triangle Site, including the Palace music venue, is the subject of a major re-development, first proposed in 2005. The proposals stipulated the restoration of the Palais Theatre, but controversially many advocated the demolition of the Palace, one of the area's main live music venues. To save the Palace, a legal battle ensued. Ironically, the Palace burned down spectacularly during an arson attack, and fears were held for the Palais. The winning development in 2007 plans a series of lanes, promenades and walkways rambling through eating and drinking spaces, art installations, entertainment venues, retail outlets and open grassy spaces. Further controversy over the new development was caused when the tenants who vacated the Palais illegally removed its 80-year-old chandeliers.

In 2006, plans went out for a foreshore re-development, which included promenade widening and saw the demolition of the bicentennial pavilion which marked the land end of the St Kilda pier.

In 2006, the proposed development of a skate park and concrete urban plaza over parkland on Fitzroy Street next to the primary school at Albert Park caused significant local controversy.  The council received a large number of objections. Alternative sites along the foreshore were ignored by council and all of the mature trees on the site were removed before the plans were presented for consultation.

In February 2008, the Port Phillip Council's approval of the proposed Triangle site development despite over 5,000 written objections (representing over a quarter of the population of St Kilda) caused an uproar in St Kilda which saw media attention across Victoria with local resident lobby groups including Save St Kilda and UnChain St Kilda banding thousands of residents together in protest and enlisting the help of celebrities including Dave Hughes, Magda Subzanski and Rachel Griffiths in their fight against the local council.  The council had refused to allow a secret agreement between it, the developers and state government to be released which effectively allowed for the transfer of ownership of a large amount of crown land to private owners.  As well as the outrage over the sale of public land, many residents believed that the state government and council should have funded the restoration of the heritage Palais themselves rather than pass the costs on to the developers who had proposed a larger development to recover their own costs.

In May 2008, the skate park development was stopped by the Supreme Court of Victoria, claiming that the council had acted inappropriately. A hearing was scheduled with the Victorian Civil and Administrative Tribunal. The mayor at the time, Janet Bolitho, was cited to have commented "the area would remain public open space – just maybe not green".

In December 2009, a new council elected to largely replace the councillors who approved the Triangle development voted almost unanimously to terminate the agreement with the developers, agreeing to pay them $5 million over a period of three years.

In the 12-month period to January 2020 St Kilda reported a median house price of A$1.34 million for a three bedroom house.

Demography

In the 2016 census, there were 20,230 people in St Kilda. 51.3% of people were born in Australia. The next most common countries of birth were England 5.2%, New Zealand 3.8%, India 2.1%, Ireland 1.9% and China 1.4%. 66.2% of people spoke only English at home. Other languages spoken at home included Mandarin 1.7%, Spanish 1.7%, Italian 1.5%, French 1.4% and Russian 1.2%. The most common response for religion was No Religion at 45.5%.

Today, St Kilda is an area of sharp social contrast, with many homeless and other disadvantaged people living among the wealthy and fashionable who crowd its shops and cafes. The suburb is noted for its many itinerant backpackers, but also for its many long-term permanent residents.

For many years, St Kilda has had the highest population density in the Melbourne statistical area, and the highest for a metropolitan area outside of Sydney. This density is reflected in the built form, which consists primarily of strata titled units, apartments and flats, including a single Housing Commission of Victoria tower.

Culture

Theatre and cinema

St Kilda has three main theatres, each catering to a different niche use; all are listed on the Victorian Heritage Register. The National Theatre (formerly the Victory) on the corner of Barkly and Carlisle Streets is a Beaux Arts styled performing arts venue built in 1920 which is home to the oldest ballet school in Australia (established in 1939). The Palais Theatre is located on the Esplanade and was built in 1927 to the design of Henry White as a cinema (formerly Palais Pictures). It is now used as a live music and concert venue. The Astor Theatre on Chapel Street is a modern/art deco styled cinema built in 1935 to the design of Ray Morton Taylor. It features the largest screen in the Southern Hemisphere, and operates as an arthouse cinema with its own year-long film festival and private functions.

Places of worship

St Kilda is home to a large number of places of worship built over the years to serve primarily the Christian and Jewish faiths, although many of the churches have since been converted for other uses. The St Kilda Hebrew Congregation built between 1872 and 1880 in Charnwood Road was one of the earliest. The present building, diagonally opposite the original site (now a block of flats) but located in Charnwood Grove was consecrated on 13 March 1927.

The former Baptist Church, built in 1876 at 16 Crimea Street served as a masonic hall before being acquired by St Michael's Grammar School. The St Kilda Parish Mission Uniting Church, built in 1877 on the corner Chapel and Carlisle Streets, has a polychromatic brick and slate roof design. St Kilda Presbyterian Church, built in 1878 on the corner of Alma Road and Barkly Street was designed by Wilson & Beswicke architects. The Sacred Heart Church is a St Kilda landmark with its tall tower built on Grey Street in 1890 to the design of renowned colonial architect Reed in partnership with Henderson & Smart architects. The former St Kilda Uniting Church on the corner Fitzroy and Princes Streets became part of an apartment complex in the late 1990s. The Holy Trinity Church built between 1882 and 1889 on the corner of Brighton Road and Dickens Street is another church by Reed of Reed & Barnes. All Saints' Anglican Church, on the corner of Dandenong Road and Chapel Street, was designed by Nathaniel Billing with the foundation stone laid in 1858, becoming what is believed to be the largest Anglican parish church in the southern hemisphere, able to seat 1400 people, All Saints' is also known for its male choir, which is the only parish church choir of its kind remaining in Australia. Other churches include the Christ Church Complex on the corner Acland Street and Church Square.

Events and festivals

St Kilda is home to many major annual events. The largest of these is the St Kilda Festival. Hailed as Australia's Largest Free Music Festival the one-day event features live music, dance performances, community activities, carnival rides, street performances, market and food stalls, and a dedicated children's area. Since the first St Kilda Festival in 1980 the event has grown in scale and now attracts over half a million visitors each year. St Kilda also hosts the annual gay Pride March, which starts at Lakeside Drive and heads down Fitzroy Street to the Catani Gardens. The St Kilda Short Film Festival is Australia's longest running short film festival and has been showcasing Australian short films since 1983. The week-long event kicks off with a star-studded Opening Night at St Kilda's Palais Theatre each year. St Kilda is also home to the many venues of the Melbourne Underground Film Festival. Until 2009, St Kilda was home to the Community Cup festival which celebrates grassroots Australian rules football having attracted record attendances of up to 23,000 and raising money for local charity the Sacred Heart Mission. A similar annual celebrity cricket match known as Batting for the Battlers is played at the Peanut Farm opposite Luna Park and attracts a crowd of up to 2,000. Other local events include the St Kilda Film Festival and St Kilda Writers Festival. St Kilda even has its own, locally organised TEDx event TEDxStKilda, which is based on the TED format and ideals.

St Kilda has run Melbourne's first major arts and crafts market which has been run on the Esplanade every Sunday since the 1980s. It has been rivalled in Melbourne in recent years by the Southbank art and craft market on Southbank promenade.

Music

St Kilda has a vibrant music scene that has produced many notable bands and artists. During the late 1970s, it became a hotbed of dark, noisy post-punk, pioneered by locals bands The Birthday Party (featuring Nick Cave and Rowland S. Howard), The Moodists and Crime & the City Solution. These and other groups such as Hunters & Collectors regularly played at the Crystal Ballroom, one of the city's most iconic venues. Paul Kelly, Tex Perkins, Fred Negro, and dozens of other independent musicians have also called St Kilda home at some point. Prominent local music venues include the Palais Theatre for larger concerts, the Esplanade Hotel (commonly known as "The Espy"), the Prince of Wales Hotel for larger gigs and DJ's (and backpackers), The George Public Bar on Saturday afternoons, the St Kilda Bowls Club, and The Greyhound – which picked up the local crowd, local bands, local bar staff and sticky carpet when The Esplanade Hotel (The Espy) kicked them out after 'suburbification' in the early noughties. The Greyhound has been undergoing a multimillion-dollar redevelopment since 2008 which has seen live music make way for a predominantly gay & lesbian clientele, building upon the successful Saturday night drag shows that have been running at the venue for over 15 years. Men at Work started in St Kilda as an unnamed group.

Sport

St Kilda has very strong historical links with Australian rules football. The St Kilda Football Club, nicknamed the Saints, formed in 1873, and currently competes in the national Australian Football League (AFL). Originally based locally at Junction Oval, the team has played its home games at several venues outside St Kilda since 1965. Its current home ground is Docklands Stadium. The St Kilda City Football Club of the Southern Football League is based at the Peanut Farm. St Kilda also has Women's Australian rules football team, the St Kilda Sharks, who won back-to-back Victorian Women's Football League titles in 1998&99. Albert Park and Lake reserve has a number of ovals which are home to Australian rules football clubs. These include the historic Junction Oval which has in the past been a prominent VFL/AFL venue and more recently a training facility for the Melbourne Football Club. Several amateur VAFA clubs also use the park for their home grounds including the Collegians Football Club (Harry Trott Oval), Powerhouse Football Club (Ross Gregory Oval) and Old Melburnians (Junction Oval) are based in the St Kilda section of Albert Park. The Community Cup was a community Australian rules event, run for 14 years by the local Sacred Heart Mission, which until 2007 drew crowds of up to 23,000 spectators.

St Kilda also has a strong cricket presence. The Junction Oval is home to the St Kilda Cricket Club and occasionally the Victorian Bushrangers Cricket Club and was the debut venue of Shane Warne. St Kilda has a wide range of other minor sports including the Collegians-X hockey club, the St Kilda baseball club, an ultimate disc club, and several social soccer clubs.

St Kilda has a Lawn Bowls scene which attracts younger players and has been popularised in film and television.  The St Kilda Lawn Bowls Club on Fitzroy Street has a long history and retains its heritage clubhouse building as well as hosts many community events.

Many of the open water events of the 2007 World Aquatics Championships were held at St Kilda beach. The 2006 Commonwealth Games triathlon and cycling time trials were held along the foreshore, and the marathon passed through some of St Kilda's main streets. The annual Melbourne Marathon also passes through St Kilda. St Kilda Beach is regularly used for state and international beach volleyball tournaments.

Recreation and leisure
Recreation on St Kilda West and Middle Park beaches includes most watersports, including windsurfing, sailing, kitesurfing, rollerblading, beach volleyball, diving, jetskiing, waterskiing, sunbathing and skydiving with Skydive the Beach Melbourne. A skate park for the Fitzroy street end of Albert Park is in the planning stages as well as the existing skate park on Marine Parade.

Built environment

Local landmarks

St Kilda has many distinctive local landmarks, most centred on the St Kilda Esplanade and foreshore area, several featuring domes of a Moorish architecture theme established at the turn of the century. Perhaps the best known is Luna Park an early-20th century amusement park with its "Moonface" entry and its historic scenic railway.

The St Kilda Pier is another local landmark and major tourist attraction. The pier is terminated by the St Kilda Pavilion, an Edwardian building in the mould of English pier pavilions which is considered of high cultural importance to Melburnians. It was recently reconstructed and listed on the Victorian Heritage Register after burning down. The pier has a long breakwater which shelters St Kilda Harbour and hosts a little penguin colony.

St Kilda Beach, with gentle bay waves, is popular with swimmers and sunbathers during the summer months. As with most metropolitan beaches near the mouth of the Yarra, however, it has poor water quality.

The St Kilda Sea Baths was a Moorish themed building built in the late 1920s and demolished in the 1990s leaving only the two turrets. After much delay after the original developer Hannah Friedman ran out of money it was redeveloped to resemble in a small way the original style and continues a history of sea baths in St Kilda which dates back to the 1850s. Sometime referred to as "Chadstone by the Sea" (Chadstone being a huge shopping mall).

Acland Street is a shopping and restaurant precinct with numerous cake shops and cafes. It also features a number of public artworks. It is now a dead-end street, with a tram stop and plaza blocking it at Barkly Street.

St Kilda Town Hall is a building originally by William Pitt. It was burnt down in the 1980s and the interior has been extensively redesigned. Directly opposite is the St Kilda Public Library, built between 1971 and 1973 at 150 Carlisle Street. This is a brutalist design by architect Enrico Taglietti, designed to open like a book; it also includes Ashton Raggatt McDougall's award-winning extension (1994).

Residential architecture

With many layers of development, St Kilda is characterised by an eclectic mix of residential styles, ranging from rows of Victorian terrace houses, Edwardian and interwar homes and apartments to post-war and modern infill development. Much of St Kilda's innovative architecture is recognised nationally.

St Kilda is home to many "boom style" mansions, dating back to the early days of the seaside resort. Historic residences include Eildon Mansion on Grey Street built in 1855 (later modified) to the design of Reed and Barnes is a significant grand old mansion. Hewison House built at 25 Chapel Street in 1869 is a former mansion that has become an administration building of St Michael's Grammar School. Marion Terrace in Burnett Street was built in 1883 and is considered one of the finest Second Empire styled terrace houses in Australia. Myrnong Hall built in 1890 on Acland Street is a large Victorian mansion richly decorated in cast iron.

Edwardian buildings include The Priory, built in 1890 at 61 Alma Road, it is one of the few Richardsonian Romanesque homes in Melbourne, built as the boarding house for a ladies' school, but now a private residence.

During the interwar years St Kilda was heavily subdivided into apartments. This era produced some outstanding early apartment designs, including Majestic Mansions on Fitzroy Street (1912). Tompkins is a mixture of Edwardian styles and are some of the earliest self-contained flats in Melbourne. Summerland Mansions built in 1920 on Fitzroy Street is another block in the "mansion flats" style, a style rare in Melbourne. Belmont Flats on the corner of Alma Road and Chapel Street was built in 1923, an outstanding blend of Arts and Crafts and Californian Bungalow influences applied to an apartment building, was built in 1923. Belvedere Flats at 22 Esplanade on the corner of Robe Street was built in 1929 and is a Spanish Mission styled block of flats designed by William H. Merritt and has featured on The Secret Life of Us. All of these buildings are listed on the Victorian Heritage Register. A significant block of Spanish Mission flats, the Baymor Court, built in 1929 was demolished in November 2004 to make way for the Esplanade hi-rise apartment development.

Edgewater Towers, completed in 1961, was Melbourne's first privately developed high-rise block and the tallest in Victoria.

St Kilda is also home to some contemporary residential designs. St Leonards Apartments in St Leonards Street is two blocks of post-modern apartments, built in 1996 to the design of Nonda Katsalidis, and is recognised with multiple RAIA Victorian Architecture Awards.

Historic hotel buildings
St Kilda features many grand old hotels, some which still operate as licensed premises and others that function as accommodation, most of which are listed on the Victorian Heritage Register. These include the Esplanade Hotel on the Esplanade. Built in 1878 and later modified, the Esplanade is a pub and live music venue known by locals as the 'Espy'. The St Kilda Coffee Palace, built in the 1870s was once the St Kilda's main coffee palace. It is now a hostel. The George Hotel was built in 1887 on the corner of Fitzroy and Grey streets. From 1979 to the mid 1980s the "Crystal Ballroom" at the George (briefly the Seaview Hotel) became a punk music venue, launching artists such as Nick Cave, Hunters & Collectors, Models and many more. In the 1990s, it was converted into studio apartments. More recently, the ground floor has been renovated and is now a function venue, nightclub and bar called The George Whitebar and Gallery. The Prince of Wales Hotel was built in 1940 in the moderne style on the site of the first Prince of Wales which was built in 1920. It has been used as a cabaret venue and is now another live music venue.

Parks and gardens

St Kilda is known for its many parks and gardens, many featuring combinations of the predominant Canary Island date palms, which are synonymous with the area and Californian fan palms. Some of the gardens include St Kilda Botanic Gardens on Blessington Street, which has heritage features and gates, a conservatory, rose garden, lake and a sustainable Eco Centre building. The gardens were once surrounded by mansions, but were subject to unit development in the 1960s. The St Kilda Foreshore and Catani Arch are on Jacka Boulevard, while the upper Esplanade reserve where the Sunday markets are held features the Catani Clock Tower, heritage toilets and vaults. The Catani Gardens which sit between the foreshore, Beaconsfield Parade and the Esplanade includes a War Memorial, Captain Cook statue and Royal Melbourne Yacht Squadron Buildings. O'Donnell Gardens is adjacent to Luna Park on Acland Street and features an art-deco monument and tall palms. Alfred Square on the upper Esplanade has numerous war memorials, which include the South African War Memorial (1905) listed on the Victorian Heritage Register. Albert Park is a large park which spans many suburbs, including St Kilda on Fitzroy Street and hosts a number of sporting fields and a recreational lake. The St Kilda Town Hall features a small public Victorian garden facing the corner of Brighton Road and Carlisle Street.

St Kilda is also home to one of Melbourne's few remaining Indigenous Australian landmarks, the Corroboree Tree. The red gum eucalyptus, estimated at being between four and seven hundred years old, is located next to Queens Road, close to the junction with Fitzroy Street. A plaque close to its base reads "Aboriginals of early settlement days congregated and held their ceremonies under and in the vicinity of this tree". These ceremonies celebrated important events, told traditional stories and promoted unity between communities, and are commonly known by the generic term corroboree, or ngargee in the local language. The site continued to be used, both for ceremonial purposes and as a fringe camp, for some years after British settlement in 1835, as is evidenced by Jacob Miller who told his son how he had witnessed the remnant Kulin population "perform their dancing about the old tree" after moving into the area during the 1850s.

The "Veg Out" Community Gardens, at the former St Kilda Bowling Club in the Peanut Farm reserve, form another public garden. The gardens are primarily rented by residents of apartments in the area and offer local residents the opportunity to express themselves in a small plot of dirt, which results in many colourful artistic displays.

Education and schools

St Kilda is home to several schools, including secondary schools St Michael's Grammar School, St Mary's College and primary schools St Kilda Primary School (on Brighton Road) and St Kilda Park Primary School (on Fitzroy Street) all of which have imposing heritage buildings on campus.

Former schools include St Kilda Grammar, which closed at the turn of the century.

References in popular culture

St Kilda has featured prominently in television. The Network Ten drama The Secret Life Of Us, which ran from 2001 to 2005, was set in St Kilda, mostly around Acland Street, Fitzroy Street and in the Esplanade Hotel. The main characters were often depicted playing social games of soccer in Catani Gardens and social lawn bowls at St Kilda bowls club, both of which have since become local traditions. The show featured a fictional pub called the Foo Bar which was often sought after by tourists but did not actually exist. The popularity of the name later inspired a real licensed venue in nearby beachside Brighton. St Kilda was also the venue for My Restaurant Rules 2004 series, with the Melbourne restaurant "Seven Stones".

Many of Paul Kelly's songs feature St Kilda, including "From St Kilda to Kings Cross" from the album Post which included the lyric "I'd give you all of Sydney Harbour (all that land, all that water) For that one sweet promenade", in reference to the St Kilda Esplanade. The area also featured in songs such as "Killed her in St Kilda" by Voodoo Lovecats, "St Kilda Nights" by Purple Dentists and "Melodies of St Kilda" by Masters Apprentices. In the early 1990s inner-city "supergroup" Hell to Pay released the song "Saints and Kings", which featured the line "Ain't too many Saints in St Kilda".

Many movies and video clips have been filmed in St Kilda, including indoor scenes from The Story of the Kelly Gang, the beach scenes of the 2005 hit Bollywood film Salaam Namaste and the 2006 film Kenny which in particular features the St Kilda Festival.

Australian rock band Hunters & Collectors filmed many of their video clips in St Kilda in the 1980s; of particular note is "Talking to a Stranger" which used the old St Kilda railway station, "Say Goodbye", parts of which were filmed upstairs at the George Hotel and "Do you see what I see?" which was partly filmed on a train running along the Sandringham line passed parts of St Kilda East, Balaclava and Ripponlea. Other musicians to film in the area include Eran James' clip "Touched by Love" which has backdrops including the Palais Theatre and St Kilda Pier and Something for Kate, whose clip "The Futurist" was filmed at St Kilda West pier. The Australian rock band The Cat Empire exclaimed in song, "We're gonna sleep on the St Ki-i-lda sands" in their song "The Crowd".

St Kilda is also the residence of the fictional character The Honourable Phryne Fisher from author Kerry Greenwood's series of Phryne Fisher detective novels, which have been made into a television series called Miss Fisher's Murder Mysteries.

The suburb of Saint Kilda in Dunedin, New Zealand, was named after Melbourne's St Kilda by early property developer (and former Melburnian) George Scott.

St Kilda is the setting for the Sam Feldt & Bloombox remix videoclip of "On Trees and Birds and Fire" by the Dutch folk band I Am Oak.

Transport

St Kilda is well connected to the Central Business District (CBD) of Melbourne by trams and a dedicated light rail line along the former St Kilda railway.

St Kilda is served by tram routes 3a (on weekends), tram 12 from Collins Street, tram 16 from Swanston Street, and tram 96 from Bourke Street. all routes are around 25 minutes from the city.

St Kilda also has water transport in the form of ferries and private boating. Williamstown Ferries operates a regular ferry service running primarily between St Kilda and Williamstown as well as operating services with to the Melbourne CBD with drop-off points at major tourist attractions which departs from St Kilda Pier. Royal Melbourne Yacht Squadron has a building at St Kilda harbour, which has berths for boats and yachts and the Squadron also operates the St Kilda Marina on Marine Parade, one of the first marinas in Melbourne.

The Bayside Trail off-road bicycle network connects through St Kilda with an additional Copenhagen-style bicycle lane running along Fitzroy Street connecting Albert Park Reserve to the foreshore.

Missing person cases

Three separate and prominent unsolved missing persons cases are associated with St Kilda. Linda Stilwell was a 7-year-old girl who was abducted on 10 August 1968 from St Kilda Beach. The prime suspect is Derek Percy, who has also been named by police as a suspect in the Wanda Beach Murders and in the disappearance of the Beaumont children.

Adele Bailey was a 23-year-old trans woman who disappeared from St Kilda in September 1978. Her remains were found in 1995 in a disused mineshaft near Bonnie Doon.

Louise and Charmian Faulkner also vanished from outside their Acland Street flat on 26 April 1980 after getting into a ute driven by an older Australian male.

Notable residents

Architects
 William Pitt (1855-1880s)
 John James Clark (died at his residence in 1915)
 Sir Bernard Evans (moved from England in 1913 and was schooled there)

Entertainers
 Margot Robbie - actress
 Trevor Marmalade - comedian
 Paul Dawber: actor, Neighbours, Sons & Daughters, The Novelist.
 Sheila Florance - actress, until 1991
 Rachel Griffiths - actress
 Magda Szubanski - comedian
 John Safran - media personality
 Zbych Trofimiuk - actor
 Chris Lilley - actor and musician
 Dub FX - musician and street performer
 Jessica Jacobs - actress, Saddle Club series 2
Charlie Vickers- Actor

Musicians
 AC/DC (1973–1975)
 Mark Seymour (1970s–2005)
 Rowland S. Howard (1970s; 1993–2009)
 Fred Negro
 Renee Geyer - singer
 Adam Briggs—better known by his performing name, "Briggs" (early 2000s)

Politicians

 Henry Bailey (lived on Alma Road for many years and died there)
 Stanley Bruce - one-time Prime Minister of Australia (born 1883, but moved in 1885)
 Albert Jacka VC - 1st AIF Army officer and former Mayor of St Kilda

Sportspeople

 Ron Barassi (Australian rule footballer; lived there from the late 1970s to present)
 Brian Dixon, Australian rule footballer
 Eva Duldig (born 1938), Austrian-born Australian and Dutch tennis player, author
 Michael Klim, swimmer
 Frederick McEvoy British winter Olympian who won bobsleigh bronze at the 1936 Winter Olympics in Germany.
 Mal Michael (2007–), Australian rules footballer
 Sir Hubert Opperman "Oppy" (cyclist; lived at Edgewater Towers from the day it opened in 1961 until he moved to retirement village)
 Jim Stynes (Australian rules footballer, lived there until his death in 2012)
 Timana Tahu, rugby league and rugby union footballer

Visual artists
 Rupert Bunny (born in St Kilda in 1864)
 Marcus Clarke (lived at 49 Robe Street in the 1870s)
 Karl Duldig (1902–1986), Austrian-Australian sculptor
 Sidney Nolan (between 1917 and 1931)
 Albert Tucker (lived at 47 Robe Street between 1944 and 1946)
 Joy Hester (lived at 47 Robe Street between 1944 and 1946)
 Mirka Mora (lived at Tolarno mid-1960s)

Writers
 Louis Lavater - poet who spent his whole life in St Kilda from birth (2 March 1867) to death (22 May 1953)
 Morris West - author of The Devil's Advocate (1959)

Other
 Jim McNeil - violent criminal and 'Prison Playwright'; subject of book The Laughing Bandit
 Dr Bertram Wainer

See also
 City of St Kilda – St Kilda was previously within this former local government area.

References

External links

 St Kilda Historical Society
 Luna Park
 Linden New Art
 St Kilda Film Festival
 Official Louise and Charmian Faulkner site
 St Kilda Marina
 From Riches to Rags and Back Again, a history of St Kilda's housing styles on Culture Victoria

 
Suburbs of Melbourne
Suburbs of the City of Port Phillip
Jews and Judaism in Melbourne
Orthodox Jewish communities
Red-light districts in Australia
Seaside resorts in Australia
Entertainment districts in Australia